Karikesh may refer to:
 Garikesh
 Garkesh